This page lists the municipal flags of Hokkaidō, Japan. It is a part of the Lists of Japanese municipal flags, which is split into regions because of its size.

Complete lists of Japanese municipal flags pages

 List of municipal flags of Hokkaidō
 List of municipal flags of Tōhoku region
 List of municipal flags of Kantō region
 List of municipal flags of Chūbu region
 List of municipal flags of Kansai region
 List of municipal flags of Chūgoku region
 List of municipal flags of Shikoku
 List of municipal flags of Kyūshū

Hidaka Subprefecture

Towns and villages

Historical

Hiyama Subprefecture

Towns and villages

Historical

Iburi Subprefecture

Cities

Towns and villages

Historical

Ishikari Subprefecture

Cities

Wards

Towns and villages

Historical

Kamikawa Subprefecture

Cities

Towns and villages

Historical

Kushiro Subprefecture

Cities

Towns and villages

Historical

Nemuro Subprefecture

Cities

Towns and villages

Okhotsk Subprefecture

Cities

Towns and villages

Historical

Oshima Subprefecture

Cities

Towns and villages

Historical

Rumoi Subprefecture

Cities

Towns and villages

Shiribeshi Subprefecture

Cities

Towns and villages

Historical

Sorachi Subprefecture

Cities

Towns and villages

Historical

Sōya Subprefecture

Cities

Towns and villages

Historical

Tokachi Subprefecture

Cities

Towns and villages

Historical

References

Municipal